Pseudafroneta is a genus of Polynesian sheet weavers that was first described by A. D. Blest in 1979.

Species
 it contains seven species:
Pseudafroneta frigida Blest, 1979 – New Zealand
Pseudafroneta incerta (Bryant, 1935) (type) – New Zealand
Pseudafroneta lineata Blest, 1979 – New Zealand
Pseudafroneta maxima Blest, 1979 – New Zealand
Pseudafroneta pallida Blest, 1979 – New Zealand
Pseudafroneta perplexa Blest, 1979 – New Zealand
Pseudafroneta prominula Blest, 1979 – New Zealand

See also
 List of Linyphiidae species (I–P)

References

Araneomorphae genera
Linyphiidae
Spiders of New Zealand